The  2006 AFF Women's Championship was hosted by Vietnam and was held from 29 May to 2 June 2006. All games were played in Ho Chi Minh City. A single round robin format was used for the tournament.

Host nation Vietnam won their first title by winning all matches, while defending champions Myanmar failed to defend their tile after losing all matches.

Results

Awards

References

External links
AFF Women's Championship 2006 at AFF official website

Women's
AFF Women's
2006
2006